Below are lists of films produced in Hong Kong in the 1950s.

List of Hong Kong films of 1950
List of Hong Kong films of 1951
List of Hong Kong films of 1952
List of Hong Kong films of 1953
List of Hong Kong films of 1954
List of Hong Kong films of 1955
List of Hong Kong films of 1956
List of Hong Kong films of 1957
List of Hong Kong films of 1958
List of Hong Kong films of 1959

See also
List of films set in Hong Kong

External links
 IMDB list of Hong Kong films

Films
Hong Kong